The following is a list of notable deaths in November 1992.

Entries for each day are listed alphabetically by surname. A typical entry lists information in the following sequence:
 Name, age, country of citizenship at birth, subsequent country of citizenship (if applicable), reason for notability, cause of death (if known), and reference.

November 1992

1
Giacomo Giuseppe Beltritti, 81, Italian Roman Catholic prelate, Latin Patriarch of Jerusalem (1970–1987).
Karl Deutsch, 80, Czech political scientist.
Tamara Lazakovich, 38, Soviet artistic gymnast, alcohol-related illnesses.
John H. Malmberg, 65, American plasma physicist.
Marianne Stewart, 70, German-American actress, cancer.
Hugh Taylor, 69, American football player and coach.

2
Anvar Arazov, 38, Azerbaijani colonel and war hero, killed in action.
Robert Carston Arneson, 62, American sculptor, cancer.
Vincenzo Balzamo, 63, Italian politician, heart attack.
Jeremias Chitunda, 50, Angolan politician, assassinated, homicide.
L. Roy Houck, 87, American rancher and politician.
Hal Roach, 100, American film and television producer (Our Gang, Laurel and Hardy), pneumonia.
Jack Whitney, 87, American sound engineer.

3
Allah Jilai Bai, 90, Indian folk singer.
Boze Berger, 82, American baseball player.
Jack Davis, 78, American child actor (Our Gang), respiratory failure.
Allanah Harper, 87, English journalist.
Teofil Herineanu, 82, Romanian cleric.
Haydn Hill, 79, English amateur football player and Olympian.
Hanya Holm, 99, German-American dancer, choreographer, and dance educator.
Raimond Kolk, 68, Estonian writer.
Vladas Mikėnas, 82, Lithuanian chess player and journalist.
Prem Nath, 65, Indian actor and director.
Chris Van Cuyk, 65, American baseball player.

4
Raoul André, 76, French director and screenwriter.
Claude Aveline, 91, French writer, publisher, poet and French Resistance member during World War II.
Ludwik Benoit, 72, Polish film and theatre actor.
Regina Carrol, 49, American actress, cancer.
José Luis Sáenz de Heredia, 81, Spanish film director.
Carlos Eduardo Imperial, 56, Brazilian actor, myasthenia gravis.
George Klein, 88, Canadian inventor.
Csaba Körmöczi, 48, Hungarian Olympic fencer (1976).
Kuniko Miyake, 76, Japanese actress (Tokyo Story, Late Spring, The Flavor of Green Tea over Rice).
Luisa Moreno, 85, Guatemalan labor leader.
Pierre Wissmer, 77, French composer.

5
Carlos Sanz de Santamaría, 87, Colombian diplomat and politician.
Arpad Elo, 89, Hungarian-American chess player.
Dick Hahn, 76, American baseball player.
Richard Hartshorne, 92, American geographer and academic.
Jan Hendrik Oort, 92, Dutch astronomer.
Carl Rodenburg, 98, Nazi Germany Wehrmacht general.
Rod Scurry, 36, American baseball player, cocaine-induced heart attack.
Vyacheslav Skomorokhov, 52, Ukrainian track and field athlete and Olympian.

6
Calvin Graham, 62, Youngest American serviceman to serve during World War II.
Sebastián Gualco, 80, Argentine football player.
Lev Orekhov, 78, Soviet and Russian painter.
Mark Rosenberg, 44, American film producer (Presumed Innocent, The Fabulous Baker Boys, White Palace), heart failure.

7
Alexander Dubček, 70, Slovak politician, traffic accident.
Fern Gauthier, 73, Canadian ice hockey player.
René Hamel, 90, French cyclist.
Jack Kelly, 65, American actor (Maverick, Forbidden Planet, A Fever in the Blood) and politician, stroke.
Scott McPherson, 33, American playwright (Marvin's Room), complications from AIDS.
Robert Nay, 35, Australian swimmer and Olympian, traffic collision.
Jimmy Oakes, 90, English footballer.
Henri Temianka, 85, Scottish-American violinist.
Richard Yates, 66, American novelist (Revolutionary Road), pulmonary emphysema.

8
Kees Broekman, 65, Dutch Olympic speed skater (1952).
He Cheng, 90-91, Chinese lieutenant general.
Ian Griffith, 67, Australian politician.
Larry Levan, 38, American DJ, stroke.
Red Mitchell, 65, American jazz musician.
Felix Schnyder, 82, Swiss lawyer and diplomat.

9
Fritz Gunst, 84, German water polo player.
William Hillcourt, 92, Danish scouting pioneer.
Ivan Holovchenko, 74, Soviet and Ukrainian militsiya general.
Natalie Joyce, 90, American actress.
Sven Selånger, 85, Swedish nordic skier and Olympic medalist.
T. Sivasithamparam, 66, Sri Lankan politician.

10
Chuck Connors, 71, American actor (The Rifleman, Soylent Green, Old Yeller) and athlete, lung cancer.
Doc Guidry, 74, American fiddler.
Hilda Hölzl, 65, Slovenian dramatic soprano.
Eskil Lundahl, 87, Swedish swimmer and Olympian.
John Summerson, 87, English architectural historian.

11
Giles Bullard, 66, British diplomat.
John Samuel Forrest, 85, Scottish physicist.
Peter Gretton, 80, English naval admiral.
Earle Meadows, 79, American Olympic pole vaulter (1936).

12
Giulio Carlo Argan, 83, Italian politician and art historian, mayor of Rome (1976–1979).
Rafael Asadov, 40, Azerbaijani officer and war hero, killed in action.
Charles Coles, 81, American actor (Dirty Dancing, The Cotton Club) and tap dancer, cancer.
Dante Gianello, 80, Italian-French bicycle racer.
Stanisław Karpiel, 83, Polish cross-country skier and Olympian.
Muhammad Masihullah Khan, 81, Indian Islamic scholar.
Gregory Markopoulos, 64, American filmmaker.
Eddie Mayehoff, 83, American actor.
David Oliver, 30, American actor, AIDS.

13
Ronnie Bond, 52, English drummer (The Troggs).
Franco Calabrese, 69, Italian bass singer.
Waldemar Malak, 22, Polish weightlifter and Olympic medalist, traffic collision.
Maurice Ohana, 79, French composer.
Johnny Ostrowski, 75, American baseball player.
St John Pike, 82, Irish anglican bishop.
Jim Zyntell, 82, American football player.

14
George Adams, 52, American jazz musician.
Byron Beams, 57, American football player.
Clem Beauchamp, 94, American film producer.
Greg Curnoe, 55, Canadian painter, bicycle accident.
Ernst Happel, 66, Austrian football player and manager, lung cancer.
Alan Jarman, 69, Australian politician.
Gregorio Prieto, 95, Spanish painter.
Joop van Nellen, 82, Dutch football player.
Keith Waller, 78, Australian diplomat.

15
Billy Hassett, 71, American basketball player.
Carl Hinkle, 75, American football player.
N. H. Keerthiratne, 90, Sri Lankan politician and philanthropist.
Toots Mondello, 81, American jazz musician.
Andrii Shtoharenko, 90, Soviet and Ukrainian composer and teacher.

16
Clancy Fernando, 54, Sri Lankan Navy admiral, murdered.
Bob Gillson, 87, American football player.
Harold Glasser, 86, American economist.
Phyllis Harding, 84, English backstroke and freestyle swimmer and Olympic medalist.
Leslie Hotson, 95, Canadian literary historian and critic.
Max Huber, 73, Swiss graphic designer.
Sir Raman Osman, 90, Mauritian politician, governor-general (1972–1977).
Gene Schott, 79, American Major League Baseball player.

17
Todd Armstrong, 55, American actor (Jason and the Argonauts, Manhunt, King Rat), suicide.
Audre Lorde, 58, American poet and feminist, breast cancer.
Dzintars Lācis, 52, Latvian cyclist.
Lu Yao, 42, Chinese novelist, cancer.

18
Ed Franco, 77, American gridiron football player, heart attack.
Dorothy Kirsten, 82, American singer, complications from a stroke.
Herman Musaph, 77, Dutch dermatologist and sexologist.
John Skehan, 70, Irish journalist and broadcaster.
Radu Tudoran, 82, Romanian novelist.

19
Jeffery Lee Griffin, 37, American convicted murderer, execution by lethal injection.
Bobby Russell, 52, American singer, coronary artery disease.
Shinichi Sekizawa, 71, Japanese screenwriter (Godzilla).
René Tavernier, 78, Belgian geologist and academic.
Diane Varsi, 54, American actress (Peyton Place, Wild in the Streets, Ten North Frederick), respiratory failure.

20
William Fields, 63, American rower and Olympic champion, and later naval officer.
John Foreman, 67, American film producer (Butch Cassidy and the Sundance Kid, Prizzi's Honor, The Man Who Would Be King).
Thomas Lefebvre, 65, Canadian politician.
Félix Marten, 73, German-French film actor, pulmonary embolism.

21
Vicente Arraya, 70, Bolivian football goalkeeper.
Severino Gazzelloni, 73, Italian flutist.
Swaroop Kishen, 62, Indian cricket player, cancer.
Shane A. Parker, 49, British-Australian museum curator and ornithologist, lymphoma.
Kaysone Phomvihane, 71, Laotian politician, president (since 1991) and prime minister (1975–1991).
Ricky Williams, 36, American musician.

22
Viktor Dubynin, 49, Soviet and Russian Chief of the General Staff, cancer.
Sterling Holloway, 87, American voice actor (Winnie the Pooh, Alice in Wonderland, The Jungle Book), heart attack.
Roberto Mouras, 44, Argentine racing driver, racing accident.
Ronald Sinclair, 68, New Zealand actor and film editor, respiratory failure.
Gerard Wall, 72, New Zealand politician.

23
Roy Acuff, 89, American country musician, congestive heart failure.
Mohamed Benhima, 68, Moroccan politician, prime minister (1967–1969).
Rita Corday, 72, American actress, complications from diabetes.
Parviz Dehdari, 59, Iranian football player and coach.
Colin Evans, 56, Welsh rugby player.
Ward Hermans, 95, Belgian Flemish nationalist politician and writer.
Manuel Pelegrina, 72, Argentine football player, pneumonia.
Jean Thiriart, 70, Belgian political theorist, heart attack.

24
Xavier Darasse, 58, French organist, cancer.
Hans de Koster, 78, Dutch politician.
Hewritt Dixon, 52, American gridiron football player, cancer.
Theodore Miller Edison, 94, American environmentalist and son of Thomas Edison, Parkinson's disease.
Frances A. Genter, 94, American racehorse owner and breeder.
Harold Preece, 86, American writer.
Henriette Puig-Roget, 82, French musician.
June Tyson, 56, American singer, violinist, and dancer.

25
Joseph Arthur Ankrah, 77, Ghanaian politician, military head of state (1966–1969).
Carlos Borja, 79, Mexican basketball player.
Piet Ikelaar, 96, Dutch cyclist and Olympic medalist.
Pearse Jordan, 22, Northern Irish IRA volunteer, shot.
Pete McCulley, 60, American football coach.
Charles Mott-Radclyffe, 80, British politician.
Mark Reizen, 97, Russian opera singer.
Dmitry Ukolov, 63, Russian ice hockey player.
Aslak Versto, 67, Norwegian politician.

26
Jon Baker, 69, American football player.
Ciccio Barbi, 73, Italian film actor.
Joby Blanshard, 73, English actor (Doomwatch).
Annie Skau Berntsen, 81, Norwegian missionary.
Marcel Cordes, 72, German operatic baritone.
Adrienne Dore, 85, American model and actress.
Leopold Mitrofanov, 60, Russian chess composer.
Néstor Osvaldo Perlongher, 42, Argentine poet, AIDS.
Kathleen Russell, 80, South African freestyle swimmer and Olympic medalist.
John Sharp, 72, British actor (Barry Lyndon, The Wicker Man, All Creatures Great and Small).
John White, 90, American singer.

27
Ivan Generalić, 77, Croatian painter.
Billy Kearns, 69, American actor, lung cancer.
Daniel Santos, 76, Puerto Rican singer and composer of boleros, heart attack.
Walt Tauscher, 91, American baseball player.

28
Frank Armi, 74, American racing driver.
Wayne Bennett, 60, American blues guitarist.
Randall Duell, 89, American motion picture art director, stroke.
Ralph Hone, 96, British Army officer and colonial administrator.
Sidney Nolan, 75, Australian artist.
Stanley Joseph Ott, 65, American prelate of the Roman Catholic Church, liver cancer.
Ville Salminen, 84, Finnish film actor, director, writer and producer.

29
Jean Dieudonné, 86, French mathematician.
Raoul Ploquin, 92, French film producer.
Emilio Pucci, 78, Italian fashion designer and politician.
Blanchette Ferry Rockefeller, 83, American philanthropist and wife of John D. Rockefeller III
Paul Ryan, 44, English singer and songwriter, lung cancer.
Robert Shayne, 92, American actor, lung cancer.
Robert F. Simon, 83, American actor, heart attack.
Tuck Stainback, 81, American baseball player.
Grady Stiles, 55, American freak show performer and murderer, murdered.
Wally Voss, 34, American bass player, Hodgkin's lymphoma.

30
Peter Blume, 86, American artist.
Jorge Donn, 45, Argentine ballet dancer, AIDS.
Bernard Lefebvre, 86, French photographer.
Ancher Nelsen, 88, American politician.
Lawrence Picachy, 76, Indian Jesuit priest and archbishop of Calcutta (1969-1992).
Kuthur Ramakrishnan Srinivasan, 82, Indian archeologist and historian.
Graham Vearncombe, 58, Wales football player.

References 

1992-11
 11